Sergei Yuryevich Tyumentsev (born 9 August 1976) is a former Russian professional football player.

Club career
He played 7 seasons in the Russian Football National League for FC Irtysh Omsk and FC SKA-Energiya Khabarovsk.

References

1976 births
Living people
Russian footballers
Association football midfielders
FC SKA-Khabarovsk players
FC Irtysh Omsk players
FC Sakhalin Yuzhno-Sakhalinsk players